Tedrow is an unincorporated community and census-designated place (CDP) in southwestern Dover Township, Fulton County, Ohio, United States. The community lies less than one mile (about 1 km) north of the Ohio Turnpike, although the nearest exit is several miles away.

The 2010 US Census counted 73 households and 173 people living in Tedrow.

Demographics

History

Spring Hill
Brush Creek, a tributary of the Tiffin River, rises near Tedrow. The creek is fed by a spring. The spring's clean water made the spot a favorite Indian campground and resting place in their migratory hunting excursions. Thus, Tedrow was first known as "Spring Hill", as shown on an 1858 plat map.

Tedrow Post Office
A post office was established in 1839, and remained in operation until 1917. The community was named for the local Tedrow family.

References

Census-designated places in Fulton County, Ohio
Census-designated places in Ohio